International Velvet is the second album by Welsh band Catatonia. It was the band's breakthrough, reaching number 1 in the UK Albums Chart, spawning two Top 10 singles, "Mulder and Scully" and "Road Rage", three other Top 40 singles, "I Am the Mob", "Game On" and "Strange Glue", and catapulted the band and lead singer Cerys Matthews into the spotlight. Album sales reached 900,000, as it became one of the biggest selling albums of 1998 in the United Kingdom. The album was also nominated for the Mercury Music Prize.

Background
Catatonia were originally formed in 1992 with Mark Roberts and singer Cerys Matthews being part of the band that released the critically acclaimed EP "For Tinkerbell" in 1993. Drummer Aled Richards and guitarist Owen Powell joined prior to the release of their first album Way Beyond Blue and the line-up remained the same for International Velvet. Warner Bros. Records had intended to release "Lost Cat" from Way Beyond Blue in the United States in 1996, but due to problems at the record label the band had never released anything in the US until International Velvet.

Release
International Velvet was released in the United Kingdom on 2 February 1998, following the earlier releases of both "I Am the Mob" the previous October and "Mulder and Scully" a few days earlier. It was awarded 3× Platinum status by the British Phonographic Industry on 12 November 1999, meaning that in 22 months it had sold over 900,000 copies. The album was Catatonia's first release in the United States by the Vapor label owned by Neil Young, but it did not chart and according to The Washington Post was "overlooked". It was Catatonia's first album release in the United States. The success of the album was seen as launching the band into the public spotlight.

Five singles were released from the album. "I Am the Mob" was released on 6 October 1997 and became the first single to reach the top 40 in the United Kingdom having reached number 40 in the chart. "Mulder and Scully", released on 19 January 1998, became their breakout hit, reaching number three in the chart, and subsequent single "Road Rage" reached number five following its release on 20 April 1998. The final two singles did not reach the top ten, with "Strange Glue" (20 July 1998) getting to number 11 and "Game On" (26 October 1998) only reaching number 33. As part of the opening ceremony for the 1999 Rugby World Cup at the Millennium Stadium in Cardiff, Wales, Catatonia performed the  title track from the album. That track had become an unofficial Welsh anthem due in part to the chorus "Every day when I wake up I thank the Lord I'm Welsh". To promote the album, the band undertook its biggest tour to date.

Reception

The NME said that International Velvet showed Catatonia "to be more versatile than you ever thought possible for such a white-bread guitar group", and that while "I Am the Mob" and "Road Rage" were "out-and-out pop songs", "My Selfish Gene" was a "masterstroke". However, NME felt that when Catatonia performed "typical guitar pop" they lacked excitement. The Washington Post thought that International Velvet wasn't as consistent as its predecessor but included it in a list of the best albums of 1998. The Independent felt the album fulfilled the promise the band had shown for years.

Legacy
In a retrospective review for AllMusic, Stephen Thomas Erlewine thought that the album fails "as often as it succeeds" in changing the band's sound from a late-80's indie pop to something more akin to hard rock. He thought that "I am the Mob" and "Mulder and Scully" had good hooks but were gimmicky and found it hard to understand all the pop culture references. Overall, he felt that the previous album, Way Beyond Blue delivered a better experience.

The album was nominated for the Mercury Music Prize 1998, which was awarded to Gomez for Bring It On. DJ Steve Lamacq hosted a special on International Velvet on his BBC Radio 6 Music series Classic Albums of the 90s in 2010. The album's title track has since achieved an iconic status within the culture of Wales, being performed at the Millennium Stadium in Cardiff for the opening ceremony of the 1999 Rugby World Cup, and representing an important part of the Cool Cymru movement.

Track listing

Personnel
Catatonia
 Cerys Matthews – vocals
 Mark Roberts – guitar
 Owen Powell – guitar
 Paul Jones – bass
 Aled Richards – drums

Production
 Tommy D – producer, mixing
 Joe Gibb – engineer, mixing
 Jason Harris – assistant engineer
 Paul Read – engineering on "Game On"
 Greg Haver – engineering on "Johnny Come Lately"
 Roland Herrington – mixing on "Mulder and Scully", "Game On", "Road Rage" and "Strange Glue"
 Dave Bascombe – mixing on "I Am the Mob"
 Joseph Cultice – photography
 Nigel Schermuly – photography

Charts and certifications

Weekly charts

Year-end charts

Certifications

Singles

 An en-dash (–) denotes countries in which the singles were not released or did not chart.

References

External links

1998 albums
Catatonia (band) albums
Blanco y Negro Records albums